A bocconotto (or boconotto) is a pastry typical of the Italian regions of Apulia, Abruzzo, and Calabria. It is often eaten at Christmas.

Its filling varies according to the region in which it is produced. In Abruzzo, this filling may contain cocoa powder, cinnamon, and toasted almonds.

References 

Cuisine of Abruzzo
Italian pastries
Christmas food